July 30 - Eastern Orthodox Church calendar - Aug. 1

All fixed commemorations below are celebrated on August 13 by Old Calendar.

For July 31st, Orthodox Churches on the Old Calendar commemorate the Saints listed on July 18.

Feasts
 Forefeast of the Procession of the Precious Wood of the Life-giving Cross of the Lord.

Saints
 Righteous Joseph of Arimathea, who buried the Master Christ (1st century)
 Righteous Eudocimus of Cappadocia, Military Commander of Cappadocia (9th century)
 Martyr Julitta (Juliet), at Caesarea in Cappadocia (304-305) (see also: July 30)
 Saint John the Exarch of Bulgaria (c. 917-927)

Pre-Schism Western saints
 Saint Calimerius, a Greek who became Bishop of Milan in Italy, Apostle of the Po Valley (c. 190)
 Saint Fabius, a soldier beheaded in Caesarea in Mauretania in North Africa under Diocletian, for refusing to carry a standard bearing idolatrous emblems (300)
 Twelve Soldier-Martyrs of Rome, by the sword.
 Saint Firmus of Tagaste,  in North Africa, he was tortured and endured terrible sufferings rather than betray the hiding-place of one of his flock.
 Saint Germanus of Auxerre, Bishop of Auxerre in Gaul (448)
 Saint Neot, Hermit, in Cornwall (c. 877)

Post-Schism Orthodox saints
 Saint Arsenius, Bishop of Ninotsminda in Georgia (1082)
 Holy anonymous new martyr of Crete, at Alexandria in Egypt (1811)
 New Monk-martyr Dionysius of Vatopedi, Mt. Athos (1822)

New martyrs and confessors
 New Hieromartyrs, at Petrograd (1922):
 Benjamin (Kazansky), Metropolitan of Petrograd and Gdovsk;
 Sergius (Shein), Archimandrite;
 New Martyrs, at Petrograd (1922):
 George Novitsky and John Kovsharov.
 Martyr Maximus Rumyantsev (1928)
 New New Hieromartyr Vladimir Kholodkovsky, Priest (1937)
 New Hieromartyr John Rumyantsev, Priest; Martyr Constantine Razumov, Priest; Virgin-martyr Anna Serova; and St. Elizabeth Rumyantseva (after 1937)
 New Hieromartyr Nicholas, Priest (1941)
 New Hiero-confessor Basil (Preobrazhensky), Bishop of Kineshma (1945)

Other commemorations
 Consecration of the Church of the Most Holy Theotokos of Blachernae.
 Translation of the relics of Apostle Philip to Cyprus.
 Repose of Elder Gerasim the Younger, of the St. Sergius Skete, Kaluga (1918)

Icon gallery

Notes

References

Sources
 July 31/August 13. Orthodox Calendar (pravoslavie.ru).
 August 13 / July 31. Holy Trinity Russian Orthodox Church (a parish of the Patriarchate of Moscow).
 July 31. OCA - The Lives of the Saints.
 July 31. The Year of Our Salvation - Holy Transfiguration Monastery, Brookline, Massachusetts. 
 The Autonomous Orthodox Metropolia of Western Europe and the Americas (ROCOR). St. Hilarion Calendar of Saints for the year of our Lord 2004. St. Hilarion Press (Austin, TX). p. 56.
 The Thirty-First Day of the Month of July. Orthodoxy in China.
 July 31. Latin Saints of the Orthodox Patriarchate of Rome.
 The Roman Martyrology. Transl. by the Archbishop of Baltimore. Last Edition, According to the Copy Printed at Rome in 1914. Revised Edition, with the Imprimatur of His Eminence Cardinal Gibbons. Baltimore: John Murphy Company, 1916. p. 227.
 Rev. Richard Stanton. A Menology of England and Wales, or, Brief Memorials of the Ancient British and English Saints Arranged According to the Calendar, Together with the Martyrs of the 16th and 17th Centuries. London: Burns & Oates, 1892. pp. 371–374.

Greek Sources
 Great Synaxaristes:  31 ΙΟΥΛΙΟΥ. ΜΕΓΑΣ ΣΥΝΑΞΑΡΙΣΤΗΣ.
  Συναξαριστής. 31 Ιουλίου. ecclesia.gr. (H ΕΚΚΛΗΣΙΑ ΤΗΣ ΕΛΛΑΔΟΣ). 
  31/07/. Ορθόδοξος Συναξαριστής.

Russian Sources
  13 августа (31 июля). Православная Энциклопедия под редакцией Патриарха Московского и всея Руси Кирилла (электронная версия). (Orthodox Encyclopedia - Pravenc.ru).
  31 июля по старому стилю / 13 августа по новому стилю. СПЖ "Союз православных журналистов". .

July in the Eastern Orthodox calendar